The 2022 United States House of Representatives elections in Minnesota were held on November 8, 2022, to elect the eight U.S. representatives from the state of Minnesota, one from each of the state's eight congressional districts. The elections coincided with other elections to the House of Representatives, elections to the United States Senate and various state and local elections.

District 1 

The 1st district stretches across southern Minnesota from its borders with South Dakota to Wisconsin, and includes the cities of Rochester, Mankato, Winona, Austin, Owatonna, Albert Lea, New Ulm, and Worthington. The incumbent was Republican Jim Hagedorn, who was reelected with 48.6% of the vote in 2020. The seat is currently held by Brad Finstad, who won the special election held on August 9th after Hagedorn died on February 17, 2022.

Republican primary

Candidates

Nominee 
 Brad Finstad, incumbent U.S. Representative, former Minnesota Director of USDA Rural Development, and former state representative

Eliminated in primary 
 Jeremy Munson, state representative

Withdrawn 

 Matt Benda, agricultural law attorney
 John Berman, electronic hardware design, test engineer and candidate for U.S. Senate (Minnesota and Kansas) in 2020
 Ken Navitsky, sales executive, former Rochester Planning & Zoning commissioner, and former Minnesota State University placekicker (running for state senate)

Declined 

 Jason Baskin, Austin city councillor
 Carla Nelson, state senator (running for re-election)
 Julie Rosen, state senator

Endorsements

Results

Democratic–Farmer–Labor primary

Candidates

Nominee 
 Jeff Ettinger, American corporate executive and former CEO of Hormel Foods

Eliminated in primary 
 George H. Kalberer, CEO and president of Kalberer Financial Management and candidate for U.S. Senate of Washington in 2018
 James Rainwater, attorney-mediator and candidate for Minnesota's 1st congressional district in 2022 special election

Declined 

 Dan Feehan, U.S. Army veteran, former U.S. Department of Defense official, nominee for Minnesota's 1st congressional district in 2018 and 2020

Independent and third-party candidates

Legal Marijuana Now

Nominee 

Richard B. Reisdorf, peace activist

Grassroots – Legalize Cannabis

Nominee 

 Brian Abrahamson

Independent

Withdrew

Brandon Millholland-Corcoran

General election

Predictions

Polling

Results

District 2 

The 2nd district is based in the south Twin Cities area. The incumbent is Democrat Angie Craig, who was reelected with 48.2% of the vote in 2020.

Democratic primary

Candidates

Nominee

 Angie Craig, incumbent U.S. Representative

Endorsements

Republican primary

Candidates

Nominee 

 Tyler Kistner, former marine and nominee for this district in 2020

Endorsements

Independent and third-party candidates

Legal Marijuana Now

Nominee 

Paula Overby, perennial candidate (died in October 2022, remained on ballot)

Independents

Did not qualify 

 Rick Olson, former Michigan state representative and Republican candidate for this district in 2020

General election

Predictions

Polling 

Generic Democrat vs. generic Republican

Results

District 3 

The 3rd district encompasses the western suburbs of the Twin Cities, including Brooklyn Park, Coon Rapids to the northeast, Bloomington to the south, and Eden Prairie, Edina, Maple Grove, Plymouth, Minnetonka, and Wayzata to the west. The incumbent is Democrat Dean Phillips, who was reelected with 55.6% of the vote in 2020.

Democratic primary

Candidates

Nominee 

 Dean Phillips, incumbent U.S. Representative

Endorsements

Republican primary

Candidates

Nominee 

 Tom Weiler, Navy officer

General election

Predictions

Polling 

Generic Democrat vs. generic Republican

Results

District 4 

The 4th district encompasses the Saint Paul half of the Twin Cities metro area, including Ramsey County and parts of Washington County. The incumbent is Democrat Betty McCollum, who was reelected with 63.2% of the vote in 2020.

Democratic primary

Candidates

Nominee 
 Betty McCollum, incumbent U.S. Representative

Eliminated in primary 

Amane Badhasso, organizer and activist
 Fasil Moghul, landlord

Endorsements

Republican primary

Candidates

Nominee 

 May Lor Xiong, Saint Paul Public Schools teacher and Hmong refugee

Eliminated in primary 
 Gene Rechtzigel, farmer and perennial candidate
 Jerry Silver, pastor

General election

Predictions

Results

District 5 

The 5th district encompasses eastern Hennepin County, including all of Minneapolis and the cities of St. Louis Park, Richfield, Crystal, Robbinsdale, Golden Valley, New Hope, and Fridley. The incumbent is Democrat Ilhan Omar, who was reelected with 64.3% of the vote in 2020.

The 5th district had the fewest number of total votes in the general election out of all of Minnesota's congressional districts. Conversely, it featured the greatest number of total votes cast in the district's competitive primary election compared to other districts in the state.

Democratic primary

Candidates

Nominee 
 Ilhan Omar, incumbent U.S. Representative

Eliminated in primary 
 AJ Kern, land planner and perennial candidate
 Albert Ross, construction contractor
 Don Samuels, former Minneapolis City Councillor
Nate Schluter

Endorsements

Polling

Republican primary

Candidates

Nominee 
 Cicely Davis, businesswoman

Eliminated in primary 
 Royce White, MMA fighter and former NBA player
Guy Gaskin

Disqualified 
 Shukri Abdirahman, U.S. Army veteran

Endorsements

General election

Predictions

Results

District 6 

The 6th district encompasses the northern suburbs and exurbs of Minneapolis, including all of Benton, Sherburne, and Wright counties and parts of Anoka, Carver, Stearns, and Washington counties. The incumbent is Republican Tom Emmer, who was reelected with 65.7% of the vote in 2020.

Republican primary

Candidates

Nominee

 Tom Emmer, incumbent U.S. Representative and Chair of the National Republican Congressional Committee

Endorsements

Democratic primary

Candidates

Nominee
Jeanne Hendricks, nurse

General election

Predictions

Results

District 7 

The 7th district covers all but the southern end of rural western Minnesota, and includes the cities of Moorhead, Fergus Falls, Alexandria and Willmar. The incumbent is Republican Michelle Fischbach, who flipped the district and was elected with 53.4% of the vote in 2020, ousting long-time Democratic incumbent Collin Peterson.

Republican primary

Candidates

Nominee 

 Michelle Fischbach, incumbent U.S. Representative

Endorsements

Democratic primary

Candidates

Nominee 
 Jill Abahsain, museum director, and former teacher

Eliminated in primary 
Alycia Gruenhagen, candidate for this district in 2020

Withdrawn 

Reed Olson, Beltrami County commissioner (running for Minnesota State House)
 Ernest Oppegaard-Peltier, progressive activist (running for congressional district 8)
 Mark Lindquist, Veteran and famed National Anthem singer for the NFL

Independent and third-party candidates

Legal Marijuana Now

Candidates

Nominee 

 Travis Johnson, farmer

Libertarian primary

Candidates

Withdrawn 

 Travis Johnson (running as Legal Marijuana Now)

Independent

Candidates

Withdrawn 

 Mark Lindquist, Veteran and National Anthem Singer for the NFL (Suspended campaign to assist Ukraine in Territorial Defence or humanitarian aid)

General election

Predictions

Results

District 8 

The 8th district is based in the Iron Range and home to the city of Duluth. The incumbent is Republican Pete Stauber, who was reelected with 56.7% of the vote in 2020.

Republican primary

Candidates

Nominee 

 Pete Stauber, incumbent U.S. Representative

Eliminated in primary 
 Harry Robb Welty, former Duluth School Board member, candidate for this district in 2018 and 2020

Endorsements

Democratic primary

Candidates

Nominee
 Jennifer Schultz, state representative (7A)

Eliminated in primary 
 John Munter

Withdrew 

 Theresa Lastovich, researcher

Endorsements

Results

General election

Predictions

Results

See also
 2022 Minnesota elections

Notes 

Partisan clients

References

External links 
 Elections & Voting – Minnesota Secretary of State

Official campaign websites for 1st district candidates
 Jeff Ettinger (D) for Congress
 Brad Finstad (R) for Congress

Official campaign websites for 2nd district candidates
 Angie Craig (D) for Congress
 Tyler Kistner (R) for Congress

Official campaign websites for 3rd district candidates
 Dean Phillips (D) for Congress
 Tom Weiler (R) for Congress

Official campaign websites for 4th district candidates
 Betty McCullum (D) for Congress
 May Lor Xiong (R) for Congress

Official campaign websites for 5th district candidates
 Cicely Davis (R) for Congress
 Ilhan Omar (D) for Congress

Official campaign websites for 7th district candidates
 Jill Abahsain (D) for Congress
 Michelle Fischbach (R) for Congress

Official campaign websites for 8th district candidates
 Jen Schultz (D) for Congress
 Pete Stauber (R) for Congress

2022
Minnesota
United States House of Representatives